Hesham Kamal (Arabic:هشام كمال) (born 1 January 1994) is a Qatari footballer. He currently plays for Al-Markhiya as a defender.

External links
 

Qatari footballers
1994 births
Living people
Al Ahli SC (Doha) players
Al Sadd SC players
Al-Markhiya SC players
Muaither SC players
Qatar Stars League players
Qatari Second Division players
Association football defenders